The Narbasi were an ancient Celtic tribe of Gallaecia,  living in the province of Minho (north of modern Portugal) and nearby areas of modern Galicia (Spain).

See also
Pre-Roman peoples of the Iberian Peninsula

External links
Detailed map of the Pre-Roman Peoples of Iberia (around 200 BC)

Tribes of Gallaecia
Ancient peoples of Portugal